Legislative Assembly elections were held in the Indian Union territory of Goa, Daman and Diu in 1980, to elect 30 members to the Goa Legislative Assembly. The Indian National Congress (Urs) won a majority of seats as well as the popular vote and Pratapsingh Rane was sworn in as Chief Minister of Goa, Daman and Diu

Results

Winning candidates

References

State Assembly elections in Goa
1980s in Goa, Daman and Diu
Goa
Elections in Goa, Daman and Diu